Leonardo Corona (1561–1605) was an Italian painter of the Renaissance period, active mainly in Venice. Born in Murano. For the church of Santi Giovanni e Paolo in Venice, he painted an Annunciation; while for Santo Stefano, he painted an Assumption. For San Giovanni in Bragora he painted a Coronation with Thorns and a Flagellation. He is said to have been a pupil of the elder Titian, and completed some of his canvases after the master's death. His pupils included Santo Peranda and Baldasarre Anna.

References

Secondary Sources

Works of Art Discovered in Venice, Alethea Wiel. The Burlington Magazine for Connoisseurs (1909) 15(78):p. 368-9. (On Corona works found in the rafters of San Zulian).

External links

1561 births
1605 deaths
People from Murano
16th-century Italian painters
Italian male painters
17th-century Italian painters
Painters from Venice
Italian Renaissance painters